Route 213 is a short two-lane north/south highway in the province of Quebec, Canada, which starts in Frelighsburg at the junction of Route 237 and ends in Dunham at the junction of Route 202. It is the shortest road in Quebec that is provincially signed.

Municipalities along Route 213

 Frelighsburg
 Dunham

Major intersections

See also
 List of Quebec provincial highways

References

External links 
 Official Transport Quebec Road Map
 Route 213 at Google Maps

213